The 1953 Northern Ireland general election was held on 22 October 1953.  Like all previous elections to the Parliament of Northern Ireland, it produced a large majority for the Ulster Unionist Party.

Results

All parties shown. Electorate 888,352 (428,216 in contested seats); Turnout 60.2% (257,924).

Votes summary

Seats summary

See also
MPs elected in the Northern Ireland general election, 1953

References
Northern Ireland Parliamentary Election Results 

1953 elections in the United Kingdom
1953
October 1953 events in the United Kingdom
1953 elections in Northern Ireland